John Darell or Darrell may refer to:

Sir John Darell, 1st Baronet (d. c. 1657), of the Darell baronets, High Sheriff of Berkshire
John Darell (died 1438), MP and Sheriff for Kent
John Darell (died 1694), MP for Maidstone and Rye
John Darrell, Puritan
Johnny Darrell, singer